Proto-Tupian (PT) is the reconstructed common ancestor of all the Tupian languages. It consists, therefore, of a hypothetical language, reconstructed by the comparative method from data of the descendant languages.

In Brazil, Tupian historical-comparative studies are being developed mainly by two scientific teams: one from the Laboratório de Línguas Indígenas (LALI) of the University of Brasília, under the coordination of Aryon Rodrigues; and the other one from the Museu Paraense Emílio Goeldi, located in Belém, under the orientation of Denny Moore. These studies provide evidence about the Proto-Tupian economy and culture, suggesting, for example, that they had agriculture.

The most accepted theory is that the Tupian language family originated between the Guaporé and Aripuanã rivers, in the Madeira River basin. There are currently 70 Tupian languages, including Tupi, Paraguayan Guarani, Awetï, Ayvu, etc.

Linguistic homeland

Rodrigues (2007) considers the Proto-Tupian linguistic homeland to be somewhere between the Guaporé and Aripuanã rivers, in the Madeira River basin. Much of this area corresponds to the modern-day state of Rondônia, Brazil. Five of the ten Tupian branches are found in this area, as well as some Tupi–Guarani languages (especially Kagwahiva), making it the probable linguistic homeland of these languages and maybe of its speaking peoples. Rodrigues believes that proto-Tupian dates back to around 5000 B.P.

O'Hagan (2014) proposes that Proto-Tupi-Guarani was spoken in the region of the lower Tocantins and Xingu Rivers. Proto-Omagua-Kokama then expanded up the Amazon River, Proto-Tupinamba expanded south along the Atlantic coast, and the Southern branch expanded up along the Tocantins/Araguaia River towards the Paraná River basin.

Lexicon
This section lists Proto-Tupían reconstructions from Rodrigues and Cabral (2012). Since the reconstructions are highly tentative, the Proto-Tupían forms are all marked by two asterisks.

For a list of Proto-Tupian reconstructions by Nikulin (2020), see the corresponding Portuguese article.

Independent nouns
Proto-Tupian independent nouns:

Human beings
 **apʷũ ‘person’/‘who’
 **aɨče ‘man’
 **pet ‘woman’
 **orʲe ‘we, I; he/they’
 **ru ‘fellow’

Animals
 **ɨčɨ ‘deer’
 **ameko ‘jaguar’
 **aʔɨ ‘sloth’
 **awuru/aworo ‘parrot’
 **arat ‘macaw’
 **moj ‘snake’
 **ɨp ‘fish’
 **enem ‘beetle’
 **ŋap ‘wasp’

Plants
 **mani ‘manioc’
 **awa/awai ‘yams’
 **ɨčɨpo ‘vine’
 **kʔɨp ‘tree, wood’
 **kɨče ‘bamboo’
 **ɨʔa ‘calabash’
 **wetʲɨk ‘sweet potato’

Nature
 **ŋʷat ‘sun’
 **watɨ ‘moon’
 **ɨpʷɨ ‘earth’
 **aman ‘rain’
 **ičʔɨ ‘river’
 **wita ‘stone’
 **ʔat ‘day’

Dependent nouns
Proto-Tupian dependent nouns:

Kinship
 **amõj ‘grandfather’
 **up ‘father’
 **čɨ ‘mother’
 **aʔɨt ‘son of a man’
 **ɨket ‘older sister of a woman’
 **kɨpʷɨt ‘brother of a woman’

Parts of the body of animals
 **po ‘hand’
 **ʔa ‘head’
 **ap ‘hair’
 **apɨ ‘ear’
 **pepʔo ‘wing’
 **uwaj ‘tail’
 **kaŋ ‘bone’

Parts of plants
 **epʷ ‘leaf’
 **akã ‘branch’
 **potʔɨt ‘flower’
 **wu ‘thorn’

Artifacts
 **ekʷʔɨp ‘arrow’
 **wɨ ‘ax’
 **ɨrʲu ‘basket’
 **waʔẽ ‘pot’
 **čʔam ‘rope’
 **atʲa ‘fire’
 **ekʷ ‘house’
 **moʔɨt ‘necklace’

Sensations, feelings, and attributes
 **ačɨ ‘ache’
 **akʲup ‘warm’
 **ečaraj ‘forgetful’
 **pocɨj ‘heavy’
 **acʔaŋ ‘thick’

Verbs, affixes, and others
Proto-Tupian verbs, affixes, and other parts of speech:

Positional verbs
 **ʔam ‘to stand’
 **up ~ wup ‘to lie’
 **in ‘to sit’
 **eko ‘to be moving’
 **kup ‘to be.plural’

Motion / directional verbs
 **ka ‘to go’
 **co ‘to go’
 **ut ~ **wut ‘to come’

Dicendi / faciendi verb
 **kʔe ‘to say/to do’

Postpositions
 **pe ‘punctual locative/dative’
 **ka ‘allative’
 **wo ~ mo ‘diffuse locative’
 **ece ‘relative’/‘associative’
 **eɾi, **wi ‘ablative’
 **eɾʲo ~ **eɾʲe ‘associative’
 **coče ‘superessive’
 **na ‘translative’

Derivational valence changing prefixes
 **mo- ‘causative prefix’
 **eɾʲo- ~ **eɾʲe- ‘causative-comitative prefix’
 **we- ‘reflexive prefix’
 **wo- ‘reciprocal prefix’

Cultural vocabulary
Proto-Tupían cultural vocabulary (Rodrigues and Cabral 2012):

{| class="wikitable sortable"
! Proto-Tupian !! Gloss
|-
| **up || 'father'
|-
| **čɨ || 'mother'
|-
| **čɨʔɨt || 'mother's sister'
|-
| **amõj || 'grandfather'
|-
| **aʔɨt || 'man's son'
|-
| **memɨt || 'woman's child'
|-
| **men || 'husband'
|-
| **atʔɨ || 'wife'
|-
| **ike || 'man's older brother'
|-
| **kɨpʔɨʔɨt || 'man's younger brother'
|-
| **kɨpwɨt || 'woman's brother'
|-
| **wamu(ã) || 'shaman'
|-
| **ekw || 'house'
|-
| **ekwen || 'door'
|-
| **tʔap || 'thatch'
|-
| **upap || 'lying place'
|-
| **eɾĩ || 'hammock'
|-
| **acoʔi || 'to cover'
|-
| **ekwat || 'village patio'
|-
| **ŋo ~ ŋe || 'cultivated field'
|-
| **čɨt || 'digging stick'
|-
| **mani || 'manioc'
|-
| **awa(i) || 'yams (Dioscorea sp.)'
|-
| **wetjɨk || 'sweet potato'
|-
| **kuɾua || 'pumpkin'
|-
| **pe || 'tobacco'
|-
| **ɾjuku || 'achiote (Bixa orellana)'
|-
| **ɨʔa || 'calabash'
|-
| **ekwʔɨp || 'arrow'
|-
| **wekeʔa || 'fish trap'
|-
| **wɨ || 'ax'
|-
| **ɨɾju || 'basket'
|-
| **čʔam || 'rope'
|-
| **waʔẽ || 'ceramic pot'
|-
| **čɨt || 'to bake'
|-
| **wɨp || 'to bake, to cook'
|-
| **mõj || 'to cook'
|-
| **eʔe || 'to grate'
|-
| **čekw || 'to pound'
|}

See also
 Apapocuva
 Indigenous languages of the Americas
 Languages of Brazil
 Lingua Geral
 List of Spanish words of Indigenous American Indian origin

References

Further reading
 
 
 
Rodrigues, Aryon Dall'Igna (2007). "As consoantes do Proto-Tupí". In Ana Suelly Arruda Câmara Cabral, Aryon Dall'Igna Rodrigues (eds). Linguas e culturas Tupi, p. 167-203. Campinas: Curt Nimuendaju; Brasília: LALI.

 
Tupian